Snitzel (foaled 24 August 2002) is a Group 1 winning Australian thoroughbred racehorse and successful stallion, having sired over 100 individual stakes winners.

Background
Bred by Francois Naude from the stakes-winning Snippets mare Snippets’ Lass, Snitzel was purchased for A$260,000 by his trainer Gerald Ryan for owners Damion and Camilla Flower at the 2004 Magic Millions Gold Coast Sale.

Racing career

2004/05: two-year-old season

Snitzel won his first three starts as a spring 2YO, including the Listed Breeders' Plate, and progressed to win the Skyline Stakes in February 2005.  Snitzel started the short priced favourite for the 2YO Magic Millions Classic and Golden Slipper Stakes however he was unsuccessful in both races.

2005/06: three-year old season

Snitzel tasted Group 1 success as a three-year-old when successful in the Oakleigh Plate at the odds of 10/1.   He was retired to stud duties after Arrowfield Stud purchased a significant ownership share in the horse.  At the time of his retirement, Snitzel had won 7 races and over $1 million in prizemoney.

Stud career

Snitzel has proven to be one of Australia's most successful and expensive stallions with his service fee being in the Top 10 worldwide, being in 2018 a total of $220,000 per service.

Stud fees

Snitzel has stood exclusively at Arrowfield Stud in New South Wales.  His service fee progression is as follows: 
2006 - $33,0002007 - $22,0002008 - $22,0002009 - $22,0002010 - $27,5002011 - $27,5002012 - $33,0002013 - $49,5002014 - $71,5002015 - $88,0002016 - $110,0002017 - $176,0002018 - $220,0002019 - $220,0002020 - $165,0002021 - $165,0002022 - $220,000

Notable stock

Snitzel has sired 19 individual Group 1 winners:

c = colt, f = filly, g = gelding

Pedigree

References 

Australian racehorses
Racehorses bred in Australia
Racehorses trained in Australia
2002 racehorse births
Thoroughbred family 2-c